Atlantic City is a 1944 American musical romance directed by Ray McCarey and starring Constance Moore. The film concerns the formative years of Atlantic City, New Jersey. Vaudeville acts are re-created in the story of how Atlantic City became a famous resort.  The supporting cast features Louis Armstrong and Dorothy Dandridge. The film was reissued in 1950 under the title Atlantic City Honeymoon.

It was the most expensive film in Republic's history.

Plot
In 1915, Atlantic City is a sleepy seaside resort, but Brad Taylor, son of a small hotel and vaudeville house proprietor, has big plans: he thinks it can be "the playground of the world." Brad's wheeling and dealing proves remarkably successful in attracting big enterprises and big shows, but brings him little success in personal relationships. Full of nostalgic songs and acts, some with the original artists.

Cast
Constance Moore as Marilyn Whitaker
Brad Taylor (Stanley Brown) as Bradley Taylor
Charley Grapewin as Jake Taylor
Paul Whiteman as himself 
Louis Armstrong as himself
Robert B. Castaine as Carter Graham
Dorothy Dandridge as Singer
Adele Mara as Barmaid
Ford L. Buck as himself
John W. Bubbles as himself
Gus Van as himself
Mildred Kornman as schoolgirl (uncredited)
Stanley Brown, playing a character named Brad Taylor, is listed in the opening credits as Brad Taylor, and continued to use this name in all subsequent films.

See also
List of American films of 1944

References

External links

 

1944 films
1940s romantic musical films
American black-and-white films
1940s English-language films
Films directed by Ray McCarey
Films set in Atlantic City, New Jersey
Films shot in Atlantic City, New Jersey
Republic Pictures films
American romantic musical films
Films set in 1915
1940s American films